The 2021–22 LEN Euro Cup was the 30th edition of the second-tier European tournament for  men's water polo clubs.

Teams

Schedule
The schedule of the competition is as follows.

Qualifying rounds

Qualification round I
The top two ranked sides from each group advance.

Group A
30 September–3 October 2021, Šibenik, Croatia.

Group B
1–3 October 2021, Syracuse, Sicily, Italy.

Group C
30 September–3 October 2021, Utrecht, Netherlands.

Group D
1–3 October 2021, Novi Sad, Serbia.

Qualification round II
The top two ranked sides from each group advance.

Group E
8–10 October 2021, Palermo, Italy.

Group F
8–10 October 2021, Budapest, Hungary.

Knockout phase

Bracket

Quarter-finals
The four best teams from the Euro Cup qualifications and the four losing sides of the Champions League Qualification Round III have been paired in the quarter-finals.

|}

Semi-finals

|}

Finals

|}

See also
2021–22 LEN Champions League

References

Notes

External links
, len.microplustiming.com

LEN Euro Cup seasons
2021 in water polo
2022 in water polo
LEN Euro Cup
LEN Euro Cup